Urubamba (possibly from Quechua for "spider's plain") may refer to:

Places
 Urubamba Province, Peru
 Urubamba District
 Urubamba, Peru
 Urubamba River, in Peru
 Urubamba Valley, Peru
 Urubamba mountain range, Peru
 Veronica (mountain), in Urubamba mountain range

Music
 Urubamba (band), a South-American music group that recorded with Paul Simon